The "Casa de Oración Hebrea", mostly known as the Coro Synagogue, is a synagogue in the city of Santa Ana de Coro, Falcón, Venezuela, a city located near the Caribbean Sea coast and the Dutch island of Curaçao; it is known as one of the oldest synagogues in Latin America.

History
The synagogue was originally a house built in the first half of the XVIII century by the lieutenant governor of Coro Don Francisco Campuzano Polanco as his residence, bought on July 30, 1847 by Mr. David Abraham Senior, a sephardic trader from Curaçao who lived in the city and formed part of the growing Jewish community of the city. Before that, the community used to gather at the house of Mr. David Valencia to pray. It is known that around 20 people gathered there for shabbat and daily prayer services. Isaac Senior, David's son and his descendants continued living in the house and using one of its rooms as a prayer hall, until the 1880s.

Acquisition by the Venezuelan Government

On February 6, 1986, the house was bought by the government of Venezuela, and on August 3, 1997, the government of Falcón State reopens the house under the name of "Casa de Oración Hebrea" (Hebrew Prayer House) as an important cultural contribution that forms part of the sephardic heritage in this region of northern Venezuela. The synagogue is on Talavera Street, in the city's old quarter and has its floor covered in sand of the Médanos de Coro, in the same fashion as the sea sand that covers the floor of Mikvé Israel-Emanuel Synagogue in Willemstad, Curaçao, from where the community arrived from more than two centuries ago.

Currently, the synagogue is part of the Alberto Henríquez Museum of Art, which belongs to Universidad Francisco de Miranda. In 2009, the university contacted the Israelite Association of Venezuela in order to find support for the restoration and maintenance of the synagogue.

References

External links 
The synagogue. Images of Coro, Venezuela. VirtualTourist.com 
GALERIA DE IMAGENES DE SINAGOGA EN CORO, VENEZUELA. CAIV 

Sephardi Jewish culture in Venezuela
Coro
Coro
Buildings and structures in Falcón
Religious buildings and structures completed in 1774
Museums established in 1997
Buildings and structures in Coro, Venezuela